The discography of American country music singer Sammy Kershaw comprises 17 studio albums and six compilation albums. Three of his studio albums are certified platinum by the RIAA, while two of his studio albums and his first greatest hits package have been certified gold. Although only one of his singles — 1993's "She Don't Know She's Beautiful" — reached the top of the Billboard charts, 25 of his singles have been Top 40 hits. Besides "She Don't Know She's Beautiful", 10 more of these have reached the Top 10, including three songs which reached number two.

Studio albums

1990s

2000s and 2010s

Compilation albums

Singles

1980s–1990s

2000s–2020s

Christmas singles

As a featured artist

Notes

Music videos

References

Country music discographies
Discographies of American artists